Kanthaswamy is a 2009 Indian Tamil-language superhero film written and directed by Susi Ganesan, starring Vikram as the titular character, with Prabhu, Shriya Saran, Ashish Vidyarthi, Mukesh Tiwari, Krishna Ghattamaneni and Vadivelu form the pivotal cast. The film was partially reshot in Telugu as Mallanna with Telugu comedican Brahmanandam replacing Vadivelu. The film's soundtrack and background score were composed by Devi Sri Prasad. The film's soundtrack was released on 17 May 2009 and the film was released on 21 August 2009. It was remade in Bangladesh as Most Welcome, starring Ananta Jalil and  Barsha.

Plot
Kanthaswamy (Mallanna in Telugu version) is a CBI officer in the Economic offences Wing, who along with his friends grants the wishes of the needy, whom they write letters to the great Lord Muruga temple by disguising as an anthropomorphic rooster superhero. During a CBI raid, he discovers a stash of black money owned by Pallur Paramajothi Ponnusamy (Pallaatti Paramjothi Punniyamoorthi in Telugu version) aka PPP, an arrogant entrepreneur, and his partner Rajmohan. Ponnusamy pretends that he has stroke to escape questioning by the police. Ponnusamy's daughter Subbulakshmi gets enraged by the news that her father suffers stroke. So she goes after Kanthaswamy to seek revenge by pretending to be in love with him.

Knowing her real intentions, Kanthaswamy plays along, which forms a cat-and-mouse chase between the two where they eventually fall in love with each other. In a parallel comedic role, Thengakadai Thenappan is also sought after by a local police inspector who tries to solve the mystery of "Lord Muruga saving the people". In a series of twists, the police inspector is able to bring out the truth that the CBI is involved in the role behind the secret work of helping the needy people, though he could not be able to confirm it. Kanthaswamy finds Subbulakshmi's family bank account password in which the black money is illegally saved. He tricks Subbalakshmi into revealing the password and answers for the security questions indirectly.

Kanthaswamy transfers the money to his own account, which he would use for helping poor and needy people. In the end, Ponnusamy originally gets stroke upon knowing that his black money had been robbed and that the account has zero balance, where they had stored it. After bankrupting Ponnusamy, Kanthaswamy encounters Rajmohan, whom people think to be a humble person. Kanthaswamy reveals Rajmohan's true intentions, which leads the people to understand Rajmohan's true colour and Kanthaswamy arrests him. Subbulakshmi, who realizes that her father is corrupt proposes to Kanthaswamy where they get married and live in Rajasthan. Kanthaswamy reads some letters tied to a tree, just like the ones at the Lord Muruga temple. He puts in a pocket with a secret smile, implying that he will pursue being the superhero again.

Cast

Production

Development
After the vigilante film Samurai, actor Vikram decides to do another vigilante film. In January 2007, early reports suggested that Kalaipuli International were set to make a film starring Vikram directed by Susi Ganesan, titled Kanthaswamy for a release during Diwali 2007. Soon after the announcement Shriya Saran, who was acting in Sivaji: The Boss at the time was chosen to play the heroine. However, due to Vikram and Shriya's projects, the film was delayed and the first schedule was postponed to July 2007. The film's first photo shoot was carried out in June 2007 at Muthukadu near Chennai featuring the lead actors. The film began filming a pre-launch trailer, the first of its kind in Tamil cinema, to be screened at the launch, with Hari, Susi Ganesan and fashion designer Chetan travelling to Malaysia to look for Hollywood-inspired costumes.

The inauguration of Kanthaswamy took place on 22 September 2007 at the Devi Paradise theatre in Chennai. For the event, a unique electronic invitation, made in China, was presented to guests who had been invited. The invitation was the size of a laptop and featured an 8-minute trailer of Kanthaswamy. Each invitation had cost about Rs. 15,000, making it the most expensive invitation in Indian film history. Following the launch ceremony, the team announced they had adopted two villages near Madurai; Sangampatti and Gandhi Nagar, to shoot in initially and then to provide basic amenities like school and proper roads among other things to the villagers for a year. The team, who were praised for their actions, were the first production team to take part in such activity in Tamil cinema.

In November 2007, the shooting was halted temporarily due to an accident that occurred at the shooting spot at the Chennai Boat Club. Cameraman Ekambaram was canning the shots as per director Susi Ganesan's instructions when a pole erected on the sets unexpectedly fell on the director's head, resulting in an injury. The film finished schedules at Italy, where the trailer was filmed as well as schedules in Tanzania, Kenya and Switzerland. During the production of the film, actor Raghuvaran died suddenly and hence subsequently, his role was replaced by Ashish Vidyarthi, which also led to a delay in the release of the film. A schedule in locations in Mexico was also held, after the team went location hunting there, with a song and several scenes canned. The film, initially described as a "hilarious comedy", was rumoured to be a remake of the American cult hit The Breakfast Club, however Susi Ganesan has claimed that the film has a more Robin Hood feel to it.

Casting
Following the announcement of the project, Shriya Saran was signed in February 2007, when she was in the middle of completing her other projects Sivaji: The Boss and Azhagiya Tamil Magan. In September 2007, with the release of the trailer several other artistes names were featured as supporting cast. Prominent supporting actor Raghuvaran was selected to play as Shriya's father and shot scenes in the role, before his unexpected death during the production of the film, subsequently, his role was replaced by Ashish Vidyarthi. Prabhu was also added in a supporting role, as well as lesser established actors such as Vikram's father Vinod Raj, Y. G. Mahendran, Shiv, Arun Madhavan, Vinayak and Alex, whilst Mumaith Khan was assigned for an item number. Later on, veteran Telugu actor Krishna was signed to a role in the project as well as Indrajith who will do a villainous role in the film. Indrajith was selected for the role ahead of other prominent character actors Arjun Rampal, Irfan Khan and Suman. Along with the change of actor for Raghuvaran's role, Indrajith's role was taken by Mukesh Tiwari and the role created for Santhanam was deleted. Moreover, Vivek, who had featured in the original trailer, opted out and was replaced by Vadivelu. Mansoor Ali Khan took up a negative role in the film to make a comeback in acting.

The producer of Kanthaswamy, Kalaipuli S. Dhanu and Susi Ganesan, the director ensembled an experienced team to produce the film. Veterans Thotta Tharani, A. S. Laxmi Narayanan and Viveka between them, take care of the art direction, audiography and lyrics respectively. Devi Sri Prasad composed the music. While N. K. Ekambaram was assigned as the director of photography of the film, the film was edited by three film editors Praveen K. L., N. B. Srikanth and M. V. Rajesh. Kanal Kannan and Chatrapathy Shakthi are the fight masters for the film, whilst Mittra media are responsible for the publicity designs of the film outputs, adding to their work with the trailer and the invitations. The film is co-produced, by Chennai businessmen, A. Paranthaman and A. K. Natraj, along with Dhanu.

Music

Tamil

The film has seven songs composed by Devi Sri Prasad(DSP). For the first time, Vikram has sung most of the songs in this movie. The songs from the bilingual albums were released to the public after an audio launch at the Chennai Trade Centre in Chennai on 17 May 2009. "En Peru Meenakumari" samples "Bambara Kannaala" from Manamagan Thevai (1957).

Telugu

Release
The satellite rights of the film were sold to Sun TV. The original Tamil version of the film was given a "U" certificate, along with some cuts by the Indian Censor Board. Additionally, the Telugu version Mallanna was granted a U/A certificate, with a few cuts from the Board. Certain theaters reduced 15 minutes of Brahmanandam's comedy from the Telugu version. Due to Raghuvaran's death, the release was postponed.

Reception

Critical response
Kanthaswamy received mixed reviews from critics, with praise for its Vikram and Shriya's performances, soundtrack, background score, and plot. However the film's writing, editing and length received criticism.

Indiaglitz reviewed that "the movie was delight to watch and praised Shriya that as a cool cat, she plays a perfect foil to Vikram in the film". Sify also reviewed that "the movie was a roller coaster ride of pure unadulterated masala. It praised Vikram and Shriya saying while Vikram rocked and the film belongs to him, Shriya sizzled throughout and carried the glamorous role with élan and the attitude". Rediff gave the film 2.5/5 stars and commented: "Watch Kandhasamy for its beautiful locales, a ravishing heroine, and Vikram's smile but go with nil expectations as this particular super-hero doesn't have much to offer a discerning viewer". Behindwoods rated the film 2/5 and stated that it was "A hollow hype". Cinema Chaat gave the film 3.5/5 stars, and stated that "Kanthaswamy is not a great film, but instead serves as an excellent example of what might have been."

For the Telugu version Mallanna, Fullhyd.com gave the film a positive rating of 3.25/5, writing that "Well, it's been long since we saw the good guys consistently act much smarter than the bad guys. And for that alone, Mallanna comes out a winner." Idlebrain gave the film a rating of two-and-a-half out of five and noted that "On a whole, Mallana is an example of what happens when popular screenplay goes wrong in any of Shankar's movies".

Box office
The film collected  13.7 million in the UK. In Malaysia it collected a $1,077,658 in its total run. In Chennai box office it collected  72.8 million in seven weeks.

Accolades
Amrita Mathrubhumi Award

 Best Actress – Shriya Saran

Edison Awards
 Best Public Relations Officer – Diamond Babu

Vijay Awards

The film has been nominated for the following categories:

 Favorite Hero – Vikram
 Favorite Heroine – Shriya Saran
 Favorite film – Kalaipuli S. Dhanu
 Favorite Director – Susi Ganesan
 Best Music Director – Devi Sri Prasad
 Best Art Director – Thotta Tharani
 Best Female Playback Singer – Rita
 Best Choreographer – Saravana Rajan
 Best Make Up Artistes – Nellai Shanmugam
 Best Costume Designer – Chaitanya and Sai

References

External links

2009 films
Films set in Chennai
Films about corruption in India
2000s Indian superhero films
Cross-dressing in Indian films
Films shot in Mexico
2000s Tamil-language films
Films set in Mexico
Indian action thriller films
Central Bureau of Investigation in fiction
Films shot in Chennai
Indian vigilante films
Robin Hood films
Films scored by Devi Sri Prasad
Film superheroes
Intelligence Bureau (India) in fiction
Indian nonlinear narrative films
Films about Mexican drug cartels
Films directed by Susi Ganeshan
2009 action films
2000s vigilante films
Films set in Mexico City
Films shot in Mexico City
Films shot in Italy
Films shot in Oman
Indian superhero films
2000s Mexican films